6-hydroxypseudooxynicotine dehydrogenase is an enzyme with systematic name 1-(6-hydroxypyridin-3-yl)-4-(methylamino)butan-1-one:acceptor 6-oxidoreductase (hydroxylating). This enzyme catalyses the following chemical reaction:

 1-(6-hydroxypyridin-3-yl)-4-(methylamino)butan-1-one + acceptor + H2O  1-(2,6-dihydroxypyridin-3-yl)-4-(methylamino)butan-1-one + reduced acceptor

This enzyme contains a cytidylyl molybdenum cofactor.

References

External links 
 

EC 1.5.99